The State University of New York at Potsdam (SUNY Potsdam or, colloquially, Potsdam) is a public college in  Potsdam,  New York. It is the northernmost member of the State University of New York (SUNY) system.  Founded in 1816, it is among the oldest colleges in the United States. It is composed of the College of Arts & Sciences, the School of Education and Professional Studies, and the Crane School of Music.

History
Potsdam was founded by Benjamin Raymond in 1816 as the St. Lawrence Academy. In 1834, the academy was chosen by the New York State Legislature to exclusively offer a teacher education program for its senatorial district. With funds from the state, and from support by preceptor Reverend Asa Brainerd, the first diploma in teaching was given in 1836, thus beginning the academy's and eventually the college's longstanding tradition of excellence in the field of teacher education.

In 1866, the State Legislature ended its funding of teacher education departments in private academies, and began establishing several normal schools throughout the state. The Village of Potsdam was thus named as one of four locations for new normal schools, and in 1867, the St. Lawrence Academy became the Potsdam Normal School.

By 1886, the Potsdam Normal School had become the first institution in the United States to offer a normal training course for public school music teachers in the United States. Founded by Julia E. Crane, the Crane Normal Institute of Music continues today as the world-renowned Crane School of Music as a leader in the field of music education.

The State University of New York was founded in 1948, and Potsdam became one of its founding members, and was thus renamed New York State Teachers College at Potsdam. In 1964, the college's mission changed to providing multiple programs, and the university adopted its current name.

During the 1980s, despite the college's traditional strengths in music and education, the college gained recognition for its quickly blossoming mathematics program under the guidance of Clarence F. Stephens. Known as the Potsdam Miracle, Stephens transformed a practically non-existent department to having the third largest number of mathematics majors of any institution in the United States during his tenure.

The college had a total enrollment of approximately 4,500 students and approximately 930 freshmen entered Potsdam in 2010. That was the biggest first-year class since 1982, and an 11.4 percent increase over the previous year's incoming freshman class, which had 835 students.

Campus
The campus is in the village of Potsdam, near the Canada–United States border. It is situated in the St. Lawrence Valley, between the St. Lawrence River and the foothills of the Adirondack Mountains, approximately 20 miles from the border of The Adirondack Park. The Raquette River flows through the middle of the town of Potsdam.

Barrington Drive runs through the center of the campus, with all academic buildings on the northwest side of the street, and all campus life and residence buildings on the southeast side. The Crane School of Music campus is in the northern part of the campus, east of the academic quad.

The college has two libraries, the Frederick W. Crumb Memorial Library in the center of the academic quad, and the Crane Music Library in Schuette Hall at the Crane complex. The college also has six performance facilities: Hosmer Hall, Snell Theatre, and Wakefield Recital Hall (three venues in The Crane School of Music), the Proscenium Theater, the Black Box Theater, and the Dance Theater (three venues in the college's new Performing Arts Center).  The college also houses an art gallery and the Maxcy Hall Athletic Facility.

SUNY Potsdam is home to the Charles T. Weaver Anthropology Museum, a teaching museum that allows students to curate exhibitions and have hands on experience with the museum's collection. Also on campus is the Art Museum at SUNY Potsdam, also known as the Gibson Gallery, which stresses its mission to connect students, faculty and all those on campus with visual art.

The affiliated non-profit organization that provides dining services and runs the union market and college bookstore on campus is known as PACES or Potsdam Auxiliary College Education Services. This organization is the largest financial supporter of the college, annually donating significant portions of their proceeds back to the college in support of scholarships and other initiatives on campus.

Athletics
In 1981 and 1986, under Hall of Fame Coach Jerry Welsh, the Potsdam Bears basketball team won the NCAA Division III National Championship.  In 1979, 1982, and 1985, the Potsdam Bears were national runners-up for this title. The SUNY-Potsdam men's ice hockey team has competed in the NCAA since 1976. Most recently, they played in the State University of New York Athletic Conference, which is a Division III athletics conference. The 1995-96 Men's Ice Hockey team won the hockey program's only SUNYAC title in school history, under Hall of Fame Coach Ed Seney.

SUNY Potsdam athletics were recently placed on NCAA probation due to an inadvertent error in the awarding of international student grants. The teams affected by the NCAA probation are men's and women's hockey, women's volleyball, men's and women's lacrosse, and women's soccer.

ROTC
Many SUNY Potsdam students participate in the Army ROTC and Air Force ROTC programs. Students can apply for ROTC scholarships to the university, and may commission as officers in the United States military upon graduation.

Army ROTC
SUNY Potsdam is a partner school of the Golden Knight Battalion, one of 272 Army ROTC Battalions in the United States. SUNY Potsdam students are the second largest group represented in the battalion, which is composed of approximately 100 ROTC Cadets. The headquarters for the Golden Knight Battalion is at 49 Elm St. in downtown Potsdam, where it has been for decades.

A Cappella 
SUNY Potsdam has four a cappella groups on campus – The Potsdam Pointercounts (1993–Present), The A Sharp Arrangement (1994–Present), The Potsdam Pitches (2007–Present) and Stay Tuned (2012–Present). All four groups have competed in the ICCA (International Championship of Collegiate A Cappella) run by Varsity Vocals. In 2018, The Potsdam Pitches made their way to the ICCA finals and performed at the Beacon Theatre in New York City. This was the first time that a SUNY Potsdam group had made in to finals.

Notable faculty emeriti and alumni 

 Ernest Blood, Basketball coach, enshrined in the Basketball Hall of Fame
 Stephanie Blythe, Opera singer, mezzo-soprano
 T. Coraghessan Boyle, Author
 Marc Butler, Politician and member of the New York State Assembly
 Michael J. Colburn, 27th Director of the United States Marine Band
 Mike Deane, Former Division 1 head basketball coach
 Daniel Decker, Composer and recording artist
 Renée Fleming, Opera singer, soprano
Stacey Fox, Percussionist, composer, filmmaker and animator
 Arthur Frackenpohl (Professor Emeritus), Composer and Author
 David J. Hanson (Professor Emeritus), alcohol researcher
 Maurice Kenny (Emeritus Writer-in-Residence), poet, editor/publisher, and essayist
 Stanley Kunitz, former U.S. poet laureate
 Chris Lee, Professional Hockey Player, KHL All-Star, 2018 Canadian Olympian
 Chuck Lorre, television director, writer, producer, composer, and actor
 Brock McElheran (Professor Emeritus), conductor and author
 C. J. Rapp, Entrepreneur and Beverage Executive (creator of Jolt Cola)
 William Buell Richards, First Chief Justice of Canada
 Stephen Savoia, Two-time Pulitzer Prize-winning photographer
 Daniel Schaefer, politician, former U.S. Representative from Colorado
 Clarence F. Stephens (Professor Emeritus), mathematics educator
 Joy Tanner, actress
 David Valesky, Politician and member of the New York State Senate
 Lisa Vroman, Singer and stage actress, soprano
 Tim Welsh, Former Head Basketball Coach at Providence College
 John Zakour, writer / cartoonist

References

External links 
 Official website
 Official athletics website

 
Mathematics education in the United States
Potsdam, State University of New York
Educational institutions established in 1816
Universities and colleges in St. Lawrence County, New York
1816 establishments in New York (state)
Public universities and colleges in New York (state)